Jefferson Township is one of seventeen townships in Kosciusko County, Indiana. As of the 2010 census, its population was 2,040 and it contained 677 housing units.

History
Jefferson Township was organized in 1838.

Geography

Cities and towns
 Nappanee (partial)

Unincorporated towns
 Gravelton at 
 Hastings at 
(This list is based on USGS data and may include former settlements.)

References

External links
 Indiana Township Association
 United Township Association of Indiana

Townships in Kosciusko County, Indiana
Townships in Indiana